Count Jean Dominique Compans (26 June 1769, Salies-du-Salat - 10 November 1845, Blagnac) was a French Divisional General from 1811 and a participant of Napoleonic Wars.

Upon the outbreak of the French Revolution Compans enlisted as a volunteer in 1789. At age 23 he was promoted to captain in the 3rd battalion of the volunteers of the Haute-Garonne. In 1793 his commanding general Dugommier promoted him to command a battalion in the brigade of Jean Lannes. Compans distinguished himself in the campaigns in Spain and Italy (1793-1797). In 1798 he was put in command of a corps of 16.000 men with which he took the towns of Fossano and Savigliano. At San Giacomo Compans was wounded by a musket bullet. Having recovered, in 1800 he distinguished himself at Montebello and Marengo.

After the Peace of Lunéville Compans was appointed the governor of the province of Coni. In this province he operated against bandits but having been taken prisoner by them he was released without harm. Promoted to general de brigade in 1804, Compans was wounded at Austerlitz. He distinguished himself as chief of staff of Soult’s 4th Corps at the battle of Jena after which he was promoted to general de division. During Napoleon’s invasion of Russia Compans distinguished himself at Smolensk, Borodino and Maloyaroslavets. In the 1813 campaign Compans served with honor at Lützen, Bautzen and Leipzig, where he was wounded by bullets and saber cuts. Recovered he served in the 1814 campaign at La Fère-Champenoise.

After Napoleon's abdication, Compans served Louis XVIII of France on the War Council. During the Hundred Days he rejoined Napoleon but declined a command in the Army of the North which was defeated at Waterloo. Having been named a Pair of France by Louis XVIII, in the trial of Marshal Ney he voted for the death penalty.

References

French generals
1769 births
1845 deaths
Counts of France
Peers of France
Burials at Père Lachaise Cemetery
French military personnel of the French Revolutionary Wars
French commanders of the Napoleonic Wars
Names inscribed under the Arc de Triomphe